The Kokosing River (ko-KO-sing) is a tributary of the Walhonding River, 57.2 miles (92.1 km) long, in east-central Ohio in the United States.  Via the Walhonding,  Muskingum and Ohio Rivers, it is part of the watershed of the Mississippi River, draining an area of 482 square miles (1248 km²).
Etymologically, "Kokosing" translates roughly to "River of Little Owls."  
The Kokosing River rises in Morrow County, northeast of Mount Gilead, and initially flows southwardly.  It turns eastwardly near Chesterville and flows through Knox and Coshocton Counties, passing the communities of Mount Vernon, Gambier and Howard.  In western Coshocton County the Kokosing joins the Mohican River to form the Walhonding River, about 2 miles (3 km) northwest of Nellie.

Upstream of Mount Vernon, the Kokosing collects its largest tributary, the North Branch Kokosing River, which rises in Morrow County and flows southeastwardly through Knox County, past Fredericktown.

Between Mount Vernon and Howard, the river is roughly paralleled by a rail trail, the Kokosing Gap Trail which continues to the town of Danville.

Variant names
According to the Geographic Names Information System, the Kokosing River has also been known historically as:
Kokoshing River
Kokosing Stream
Owl Creek
Vernon
Vernon River

See also
List of rivers of Ohio

References

External links
Columbia Gazetteer of North America entry

Rivers of Ohio
Rivers of Coshocton County, Ohio
Rivers of Knox County, Ohio
Rivers of Morrow County, Ohio